Basso may refer to:

 Basso (surname) – an Italian surname
 Basso & Brooke – a fashion label formed by Bruno Basso and Christopher Brooke
 Campanile Basso – a mountain in the Brenta group 
 San Basso – a Baroque style deconsecrated Roman Catholic church in central Venice, Italy
 49501 Basso – a minor planet
 Basso Bikes – an Italian bicycle manufacturer

Music 

 Bass (voice type) – a type of classical male singing voice and has the lowest vocal range of all voice types
 Basso continuo – parts provided the harmonic structure of the music by supplying a bassline and a chord progression
 Basso profondo – the bass voice subtype with the lowest vocal range

See also 

 Bass (disambiguation)
 Bassa (disambiguation)
 Bassi (disambiguation)